Aspidoglossa is a genus of beetles in the family Carabidae. It is found primarily in the Neotropics with one species, Aspidoglossa subangulata, in the United States.

Aspidoglossa contains the following species:

 Aspidoglossa aerata Putzeys, 1846
 Aspidoglossa agnata Putzeys, 1866
 Aspidoglossa brachydera H. W. Bates, 1878
 Aspidoglossa crenata (Dejean, 1825)
 Aspidoglossa cribrata Putzeys, 1846
 Aspidoglossa curta Putzeys, 1866
 Aspidoglossa distincta Putzeys, 1866
 Aspidoglossa intermedia (Dejean, 1831)
 Aspidoglossa korschefskyi Kult, 1950
 Aspidoglossa latiuscula Putzeys, 1866
 Aspidoglossa mexicana (Chaudoir, 1837)
 Aspidoglossa minor Kult, 1950
 Aspidoglossa obenbergeri Kult, 1950
 Aspidoglossa ogloblini Kult, 1950
 Aspidoglossa pallida Putzeys, 1846
 Aspidoglossa rivalis Putzeys, 1846
 Aspidoglossa ruficollis Putzeys, 1866
 Aspidoglossa schach (Fabricius, 1792)
 Aspidoglossa semicrenata (Chaudoir, 1843)
 Aspidoglossa sphaerodera (Reiche, 1842)
 Aspidoglossa striatipennis (Gory, 1833)
 Aspidoglossa subangulata (Chaudoir, 1843)
 Aspidoglossa submetallica Putzeys, 1846
 Aspidoglossa szekessyi Kult, 1950
 Aspidoglossa torrida Putzeys, 1846

References

Scaritinae